Caravan Tonight is the first album by American singer-songwriter Steven Grossman. Released in 1974, it was the first album dealing with openly gay themes and subject matter within its lyrics to be released on a major label (Mercury Records). At the time of its release, Stephen Holden in Rolling Stone described it as, "...staggering, its appeal to the finest human values universal." Grossman himself said of the album, "The songs on the album came from a time when I was flipping out. Really confused... But for the first time I could write about what I felt not what I thought other people wanted to hear."

English model, actress, and singer Twiggy recorded a cover of the title track "Caravan Tonight" on her 1976 self-titled album.

Singer/songwriter Mark Weigle covered "Out" on his 2002 album Out Of The Loop; it was a digital duet with Grossman.

Track listing
Side one
Caravan Tonight
Out
Five O'Clock Song
Christopher's Blues
Song to Bonnie
Song to That M&M Man
Side two
You Don't Have to Be Ashamed
Many Kinds of Love
Can't...Papa Blues
Circle Nine Times
Dry Dock Dreaming

Musicians
Acoustic guitar and vocals – Steven Grossman
Acoustic lead and electric guitar – Vinny Fuccella
Bass – Andy Munson
Drums – Jimmy Young
Keyboards and recorder – Chris Dedrick
Congas and percussion – George Devens
Mandolin, banjo, pedal steel guitar – Eric Weissberg
Background vocals – Steven, Bobby, Lanny and The Free Design
Horns and strings arranged and conducted by Chris Dedrick

External links

References

1974 debut albums
Folk rock albums by American artists